Michaela Erler (born 29 June 1965) is a German handball player. She participated at the 1992 Summer Olympics, where the German national team placed fourth.

References 
 Profile at sports-reference.com

1965 births
Living people
Handball players from Berlin
German female handball players
Olympic handball players of Germany
Handball players at the 1992 Summer Olympics
Handball players at the 1996 Summer Olympics